Henderson Central Business Historic District is a national historic district located at Henderson, Vance County, North Carolina.  It encompasses 91 contributing buildings and 1 contributing structure in the central business district of Henderson.  The district developed between about 1881 and 1937 and includes notable examples of Romanesque Revival and Classical Revival architecture styles. Located in the district are the separately listed Henderson Fire Station and Municipal Building, Vance County Courthouse, and Zollicoffer's Law Office.  Other notable buildings include the (former) First National Bank (1921), Davis Department Store (1886, 1911), P. H. Rose Building (1929, 1949), Gaston Railroad Depot (c. 1870), Pogue's Tobacco Works (c. 1880), J, A. Kelly Tobacco Prizehouse (c. 1888), (former) H. Leslie Perry Public Library (1924, 1950s), (former) United States Post Office (1911) designed by the Office of the Supervising Architect under James Knox Taylor, O'Neil Building (1885, 1929), First United Methodist Church (1930), Holy Innocents Episcopal Church (1885, 1916, 1957), and First Presbyterian Church (1900, 1929, 1960).

It was listed on the National Register of Historic Places in 1987.

References

Historic districts on the National Register of Historic Places in North Carolina
Romanesque Revival architecture in North Carolina
Neoclassical architecture in North Carolina
Buildings and structures in Vance County, North Carolina
National Register of Historic Places in Vance County, North Carolina